Beatrice "Beattie" Southby Goad (born 31 May 1997) is an Australian professional soccer player who plays for Melbourne Victory. Previously, she has played in the Australian A-League Women for Melbourne City, for Stanford University in the USA's NCAA Division I, for SV Meppen in the German 1. Liga, and for UDG Tenerife in the Spanish Primera División.

Club career

Melbourne Victory
Goad was Melbourne Victory's youngest goalscorer and the youngest ever Victorian to play in a Grand Final.

Melbourne City
In September 2015, Goad joined rival club Melbourne City for their inaugural season.

Stanford University
In February 2016, following a stellar season with Melbourne City and enjoying academic success, earning a place in the top 1% of students in Victoria, Goad joined Stanford University on a four-year program.

SV Meppen
In August 2020, Goad signed for Frauen-Bundesliga side SV Meppen.

UDG Tenerife

Return to Melbourne Victory
In September 2022, Goad returned to Australia, re-joining Melbourne Victory.

International career 
Goad earned her first national team cap in April 2021, appearing as a substitute against Germany in a friendly match.

References

1997 births
Living people
Australian women's soccer players
Women's association football midfielders
Melbourne Victory FC (A-League Women) players
Melbourne City FC (A-League Women) players
A-League Women players
Stanford Cardinal women's soccer players
People educated at Lauriston Girls' School
Expatriate women's footballers in Spain
Australian expatriate women's soccer players
Expatriate women's soccer players in the United States
Expatriate women's footballers in Germany
Australian expatriate sportspeople in Germany
Australian expatriate sportspeople in the United States
Australian expatriate sportspeople in Spain
Soccer players from Melbourne
Sportswomen from Victoria (Australia)
UD Granadilla Tenerife players
Primera División (women) players
Frauen-Bundesliga players
Australia women's international soccer players